The Egret-class sloops were a three ship class of a long-range escort vessels used in the Second World War by the Royal Navy. They were fitted with Denny Brown stabilisers and the Fuze Keeping Clock anti-aircraft fire control system.

Ships

Service history
Pelican was an effective convoy escort, and was credited with the destruction of four U-boats. She survived until the end of the war, and was broken up in 1958.
Egret was lost to a guided missile. While patrolling in the Bay of Biscay, she was attacked by 18 Do 217 aircraft, one of which carried the Henschel Hs 293 guided bomb.

Notes

References

External links

Egret class sloops at britainsnavy.co.uk

 
Ship classes of the Royal Navy
Sloops of the Royal Navy